Wee Ee Cheong  (born 1952/1953) is a Singaporean businessman, and the deputy chairman and chief executive officer (CEO) of United Overseas Bank (UOB) since April 2007.

Early life
He is the eldest son of Wee Cho Yaw.

Wee has a bachelor's degree in business administration and a master's degree in applied economics — both from the American University.

Career
In 1979, Wee joined UOB, and in 2000, was appointed deputy chairman and president. Wee has been CEO of UOB since April 2007.

Wee is also deputy chairman of Far Eastern Bank, chair of the Association of Banks in Singapore and the IBF Standards Committee, and an honorary council member of the Singapore Chinese Chamber of Commerce & Industry.

Honours
He was awarded the Public Service Star in 2013.

Personal life
His elder son, Wee Teng Wen, founded a food and beverage company — Lo and Behold Group while his younger son, Wee Teng Chuen, runs an energy-management consultancy — GP Solutions. Both sons are co-founders of For The Love of Laundry, an "environment-friendly laundry service".

References

1950s births
Singaporean businesspeople
Chinese businesspeople
Singaporean people of Hokkien descent
Living people
Singaporean people of Chinese descent